Ernest Thorne Warren (born 14 September 1910) was an English professional footballer who played as an inside-forward for various clubs in the 1930s, including Southampton, Northampton Town and Hartlepools United in the Football League.

Football career
Thorne was born in Sunderland and played football for his colliery side at Usworth when he was spotted by scouts from Southampton and invited to the south coast to join the Second Division side.

He started his career at The Dell in the reserves for whom he scored eight goals in 12 games leading to a place in the first team when he was selected to play at inside-left at West Bromwich Albion in the final game of the 1929–30 season. The game ended in a 5–1 defeat as the Saints finished seventh in the table.

Although Vernon remained with Southampton for another year, he was not selected again for the first team and left the club in the summer of 1931, dropping down to the Birmingham & District League with Burton Town.

In 1933, he returned to the Football League, spending a season each at  Northampton Town and Hartlepools United before winding up his career at South Shields in the North Eastern League.

References

External links
Career details on www.11v11.com

1910 births
Year of death missing
Footballers from Sunderland
English footballers
Association football forwards
Southampton F.C. players
Burton Town F.C. players
Northampton Town F.C. players
Hartlepool United F.C. players
South Shields F.C. (1936) players
English Football League players